Joniškis District Municipality (Joniškio rajono savivaldybė) is a territorial unit of Lithuania with a population of about 30,000. The administrative center of the municipality is the city of Joniškis.

Elderships 
Joniškis District Municipality is divided into 10 elderships:

References

 
Municipalities of Šiauliai County
Municipalities of Lithuania